Chelomey may refer to:
 8608 Chelomey, main-belt asteroid
 Vladimir Chelomey (1914–1984), Soviet mechanics scientist

Russian-language surnames